One Thing or The One Thing may refer to:

Albums
The One Thing (album), a 1993 album by Michael Bolton
One Thing, a 1989 album by Sylvia Juncosa

Songs
"One Thing" (Alicia Keys song), 2012
"One Thing" (Finger Eleven song), 2003
"One Thing" (Gravity Kills song), 2002
"One Thing" (One Direction song), 2012
"1 Thing", a 2005 song by Amerie
"The One Thing" (song), a 1982 song by INXS
"The One Thing", a 2014 song by Shakira from the album Shakira
"One Thing", by Soulsavers from their 2015 album Angels & Ghosts
"One Thing", a song by Hellyeah from their 2007 album Hellyeah

Other uses
The One Thing (book), 2013 non-fiction self-help book